The Beechcraft Baron is a light twin-engined piston aircraft designed and produced by Beechcraft. The aircraft was introduced in 1961. A low-wing monoplane developed from the Travel Air, it remains in production.

Design and development

The direct predecessor of the Baron was the Beechcraft 95 Travel Air, which incorporated the fuselage of the Bonanza and the tail control surfaces of the T-34 Mentor military trainer. To create the new airplane, the Travel Air's tail was replaced with that of the Beechcraft Debonair,  the engine nacelles were streamlined, six-cylinder engines were added, and the aircraft's name was changed.  In 1960, the Piper Aztec was introduced, using two 250 hp Lycoming O-540 engines; Cessna too had improved its 310 with two Continental IO-470 D, producing 260 hp. Meanwhile, Beechcraft's Bonanza had been improved with a Continental IO-470-N. But the answer to competition was to make a true twin-engined variant of the Bonanza. The first model, the 55, was powered by two six-cylinder IO-470-L engines producing 260 hp at 2,625rpm each; it was introduced in 1961. The first Baron included the fully-swept vertical stabilizer of the Debonair while still retaining the four to four+five place seating of the Travel Air.

Variants
Barons come in three basic types: the Baron 55 (short body), Baron 56 (short body) and Baron 58 (long body), with several sub-variants each.

Baron 55

The early Baron 55, A55 and B55 were fitted with  Continental IO-470 engines and had gross weights of 4880 to 5100 lb (2,200 to 2,300 kg). These had a typical cruise speed of 190 knots (350 km/h) at 7000 ft (2100 m), and came with 116 or 136 US gallon (440 or 515 L) fuel tanks. Although its performance was eclipsed by the later variants, the B55 continued to be offered as the basic economy model until the end of the Baron 55 model run, and it would ultimately capture about half of total 55-series sales.

The Baron 55 was sold with four seats in two rows as standard equipment; a third-row fifth seat was optional initially, and a sixth seat became optional on the A55. However, the lack of a rear passenger door or a second-row pass-through hampers access to the third-row seats, and adults often find the rear fuselage taper confining. Additionally, the aircraft tend to exceed the aft center of gravity (CG) limit with all six seats occupied and no baggage in the nose compartment to act as counterbalance. Owners often remove the third-row seats and use the rear fuselage as additional baggage space.

Model 55 Barons were produced from 1961 to 1983, with 3,651 manufactured. All use the ICAO aircraft type designator BE55.

Model 95-55 Baron Baron prototype.
55 Introduced 1961. Four to five seat, twin engined transport, powered by two 260-hp Continental IO-470-l six cylinder piston engines. 190 units built. Priced at $58,250. 
A55 Built 1962 through 1963. Four to five seats. Improvements were a new instrument panel, interior, and exterior paint scheme. Priced at $58,950.
B55 Introduced in 1964, run through 1982. Four to six-seats. New exterior scheme and interior design. Priced at $59,950 (1964), $177,500 (1982).
C55 Built 1966 through 1967. Four to six seats. Powered by two, 285-hp Continental IO-520-C piston engines. Increased performance over the B55. Nose lengthened to accommodate more baggage or equipment, and to improve weight and balance. Crack-prone engine air intake box design changed. Alternators changed from belt driven to gear driven. 451 aircraft built. Priced at $68,350 in 1966.
D55 Built 1968 through 1969. Four to six seats. Introduced new paint scheme and 'speed-slope' windshield. Changed to three blade props and a different flap configuration. 316 aircraft built. Priced at $73,950 in 1968.
E55 Introduced in 1970, run through 1982. Four to six seats. Incorporated new paint scheme and interior design. Improved avionics and panel. Wing-tip lights and rotating beacon made flush; new entrance step. Also added were 172 US gallon (166 usable) interconnected tanks with one fill cap per wing became an option in 1976. 433 built. Priced at $83,950 in 1970, $219,500 in 1982.

Baron 56TC

In 1967, Beechcraft had begun development of a faster, pressurized twin, the Model 60 Duke; the Duke was to go head-to-head with Cessna's 320 Skyknight. The Duke was to use two turbocharged 380-hp Lycoming TIO-541-E1A4 engines, therefore, Beech wanted experience working with, and flying the new engine. The engine was fitted to a modified Baron C55, becoming the 56TC (that prototype, EG-1, was later retired after certification). The results of the 56TC were as planned, it proved a good testbed and experience building model for the Duke's development. However, it was a noticeably loud airplane, especially so for a Beechcraft. Along with its increased noise, the 56TC had an increase in structural strength and thus empty weight to compensate for the higher power. When introduced in 1967, it was the fastest Beech aircraft, rivaling even the early King Airs sold at the time. 93 Baron 56TC aircraft were built between 1967 and 1971 and all use the ICAO type designator BE56.

56TC Introduced in 1967, built until the 1969 model year. Four to six seats. Power came from two 380-hp (283-kW) Lycoming TIO-540-E1B4 turbocharged piston engines. Priced at $89,950 in 1967. 82 aircraft sold.

A56TC Introduced 1970, built until 1971. Only model change throughout the 56 production. Featured new exterior paint scheme and interior design, new instrument panel, smooth rotating beacon and navigation lights, nose wheel light. Priced at $101,750 in 1970. 11 manufactured.

Baron 58

Introduced for the model year 1969, the larger, more powerful Baron 58 was developed from the Baron 55, with an increased gross weight of 5,400 lbs. Depending on the variant, the Baron 58 is fitted with either Continental IO-520 or IO-550 300-hp engine. The Baron 58 can cruise at 200 knots (370 km/h) at 7000 ft (2100 m). The entire fuselage was repositioned forward on the wing to address the aft CG issue that plagued the short-body models. The longer 58 fuselage has four side windows while the 55 and 56 fuselages have three. The larger fuselage and improved rear-cabin access have made the 58 far more popular with commercial air charter and cargo operators than the smaller 55 and 56.

ICAO type designator of all versions is BE58.

In 1976, the turbocharged Baron 58TC and pressurized Baron 58P were introduced. These variants were powered by turbocharged Continental TIO-520s of 310–325 hp (230–240 kW), had an increased 6100–6200 lb (about 2800 kg) gross weight, and were certified under FAR23 with a new type certificate. The Baron 58P/58TC models were capable of cruising at 200 knots (370 km/h) at 8000 ft (2400 m) and 220 knots (410 km/h) at 20000 ft (6100 m), and were typically equipped with 190 US gallon (719 L) fuel tanks.

In 1984, the instrument panel was redesigned to eliminate the large central control column and engine controls mounted high on the instrument panel to clear it. In pre-1984 aircraft with the optional dual control yokes, the arm to the right-hand yoke partially blocks the radios and some cockpit switchgear. The redesign provides a more industry-standard control arrangement and increases instrument panel space, but the aircraft lost the option of having a single yoke, which enhanced comfort for a passenger or relief pilot in the right-hand seat.

Although the turbocharged 58TC/58P variants were discontinued in 1984 and 1985, respectively, the normally aspirated Baron 58 was still in production as of 2021. The current production version is the G58, featuring a glass cockpit, improved passenger cabin and changes to selected airframe details.

58 Baron Original variant, introduced in 1969 and run through 2004 (production continued as G58). Four to six seats. Powered by two 285-hp Continental IO-520-C or Continental IO-550-C piston engines. 2,124 aircraft built.
58P Baron Introduced 1976, run through 1985. Pressurized cabin, powered by two Continental TSIO-520-L turbocharged piston engines. Priced at $200,750 in 1976. 495 produced.
58TC Baron Introduced in 1976, run through 1984. Turbocharged engines, powered by 310 hp Continental TSIO-520-L engines. First flew  October 31, 1975. Priced at $170,750 in 1976. 151 aircraft sold.
G58 Baron Introduced in 2005, currently in production. Version of 58 Baron with Garmin G1000 glass cockpit avionics.
G58 Baron ISR Introduced in 2013, Beechcraft developed a low cost ISTAR aircraft for Fuerzas Unidas de Rapida Acción (FURA), an agency within the Puerto Rico Police Department. In 2014, the aircraft was upgraded with a FLIR 230-HD electro-optical/infrared (EO/IR) camera system, operator's console that housed the mapping/mission management computer, a recorder, a multi-band communications radio system and data link for special mission operators.

T-42A Cochise (95-B55B)

The T-42A Cochise is a military version of the Baron 95-B55 for use by the United States Army as an instrument training aircraft. The Army Aviation School took delivery of 65 aircraft, a further five were bought for delivery to the Turkish Army.

By 1993, the Army's remaining T-42 aircraft had been transferred to the Army Reserve and the National Guard and were no longer in standard use.

SFERMA SF-60A Marquis

A twin  Astazou X turboprop modification of the Baron first flown in 1961 developed from SFERMA's 1960 Astazou IIA turboprop conversion of a Model 95 Travel Air (SFERMA PD-146 Marquis). At least ten converted to follow on from eight converted Travel Airs.

Operators

Government operators 
  
 Presidential Flight – One Baron 55 temporarily transferred during 1989 from the Junta Nacional de Carnes.

Military operators
  
 Argentine Army – One Baron 55 and one 58. Retired in 1983.

 Bolivian Air Force – One, crashed 2 May 2020
  
Haiti Air Corps
 

 Indonesian Navy – 2x G58 Baron in 2015
  
 Mexican Air Force
 Mexican Naval Aviation
  
 Rhodesian Air Force – One aircraft only.
  
 Spanish Air Force
  
 Turkish Air Force
 Turkish Army
  
 United States Army
 
 Uruguayan Air Force

Accidents and incidents
The Beechcraft Baron has been involved in the following notable accidents and incidents.
On 20 July 1973, land artist Robert Smithson, a photographer, and the pilot died in the crash of a Baron E55, aircraft registration number N814T, while inspecting the site of Smithson's earthwork Amarillo Ramp on the ranch of Stanley Marsh 3 near Amarillo, Texas. The National Transportation Safety Board (NTSB) attributed the accident to the pilot's failure to maintain airspeed, with distraction being a contributing factor.
On 3 August 1976, Jerry Litton, U.S. Representative from Missouri, his wife and two children, and two others died when their Baron 58, registration number N1553W, crashed shortly after takeoff from Chillicothe Municipal Airport in Chillicothe, Missouri, on the same day that Litton had won the Democratic Party primary for the 1976 United States Senate election in Missouri. The NTSB attributed the accident to an engine failure caused by breakage of the crankshaft; the pilot's failure to maintain airspeed and raise the landing gear were contributing factors.
On 5 January 1977, in the Connellan air disaster, fired Connellan Airways pilot Colin Richard Forman deliberately crashed a stolen Baron 58, registration VH-ENA, into the Connellan Airways complex at Alice Springs Airport, killing himself, his former manager and three other Connellan employees, and injuring four others.
On 23 November 1982, Southern Baptist religious humorist, television personality and author Grady Nutt and two air charter pilots died in the near-vertical crash of a Baron 95-B55, registration number N18411, shortly after takeoff from Folsom Field in Cullman, Alabama under nighttime instrument meteorological conditions. The NTSB was unable to conclusively determine the cause of the crash, but bad weather and poor visibility were thought to be contributing factors.
On 14 February 2000, Champ Car racing team owner and 11-time Indianapolis 500 driver Tony Bettenhausen Jr., his wife and two others were killed when the Baron 58 piloted by Bettenhausen, registration number N875JC, crashed in Cynthiana, Kentucky. The aircraft had flown into known icing conditions and was properly equipped and certified to do so, but the NTSB found that Bettenhausen had allowed airspeed to decay below the certified  minimum in icing conditions, causing the aircraft to rapidly lose altitude.
On 26 July 2018, Luis Gneiting, Minister of Agriculture and Livestock of Paraguay, the vice minister and the two pilots were killed when their Baron crashed shortly after takeoff from Juan de Ayolas Airport.
On 24 January 2021, a Baron 95-B55, registration PT-LYG, belonging to the Palmas Futebol e Regatas association football team, crashed shortly after departing Palmas–Brigadeiro Lysias Rodrigues Airport, killing all six people on board: four members of the football team, the team's owner, and the pilot.

Specifications (B55)

See also

Notes

References

Bibliography
 Baron G58 Pilots Operating Handbook, Doc. No. 58-590000-67, Revision A12 May 27, 2015. Wichita: Beechcraft Corporation
 Andrade, John. Militair 1982. London: Aviation Press Limited, 1982. 
 Ball, Larry A: From Travel Air to Baron...How Beech Created a Classic, Ball Publications, 1994. 
 Chillon, J., Dubois, J-P., & Wegg, J. French Post-War Transport Aircraft. Tonbridge, Kent, UK: Air Britain (Historians) Ltd., 1980. . 
 Harding, Stephen. U.S. Army Aircraft Since 1947. Shrewsbury, UK: Airlife Publishing, 1990. .
 Hoyle, Craig. "World Air Forces Directory". Flight International, December 4–10, 2018. Vol. 194, No. 5665. pp. 32–60. .
 Taylor, John W. R. Jane's All The World's Aircraft 1976–77. London: Jane's Yearbooks, 1976, .
 Wheeler, Barry C. "World's Air Forces 1979". Flight International, August 4, 1979. Vol. 116, No. 3672. pp. 333–386.

External links

 Official Beechcraft Baron site
 GlobalSecurity.org: T-42 Cochise

Baron
1960s United States civil utility aircraft
Low-wing aircraft
Aircraft first flown in 1960
Twin piston-engined tractor aircraft